"Fallen Heroes" is a two-part episode that concludes the  sixth season of the American police drama television series Homicide: Life on the Street.  It comprises the 99th and 100th overall episodes of the series, and originally aired on NBC in the United States on May 1, 1998 (Part 1) and May 8, 1998 (Part 2).

The episode marks the final appearances of recurring character Junior Bunk, as well as the series' break-out character, Frank Pembleton (not counting the television movie that appeared after the series).  It also marks the last appearance of Mike Kellerman as a series regular, although actor Reed Diamond would later reprise this role as a guest star in a two-part episode of season seven.

Plot summary
While Falsone and Stivers investigate the murder of a probation officer, Bayliss and Pembleton investigate the stabbing of Judge Gibbons, and conclude that the culprit was Nathaniel Lee Mahoney, Georgia Rae's son. Their search for Nathaniel Lee reaches a dead end until Meldrick Lewis reveals that Nathaniel Lee is also called "Junior Bunk", a small-time hood who had crossed paths with the Homicide detectives in previous episodes. When Bayliss and Pembleton bring Junior Bunk into the Box, they are taken aback by his new hard-core attitude, which contrasts sharply with his previously meek demeanor. Despite the detectives' confidence that the judge's murder was ordered by Georgia Rae, Junior refuses to give up his mother. Junior is left shackled to a desk in the squad room, where he waits to be processed and is mocked by Meldrick. Left unattended for a moment, Junior grabs a Glock 19 pistol from an unlocked desk drawer, where he had seen a detective put it away earlier, and starts firing at officers. His shots kill three uniformed police officers and wound Ballard and Gharty. After he stops shooting, there is a moment when the police are too stunned to respond, and he takes advantage of this by demanding he be released. However, he is then immediately cut down in a hail of bullets from Giardello, Kellerman, Lewis, and Bayliss.

As Ballard (who was hit in the foot) and Gharty (who was hit in the chest) are rushed to surgery, Giardello declares all-out war on the Mahoney crime organization, resulting in a series of arrests and raids. In one raid, Georgia Rae is found dead, killed by her own panicked employees. When one fleeing suspect aims his weapon at Pembleton, Frank draws his Glock as well, but hesitates long enough for the perp to fire a shot. Tim Bayliss shoves Pembleton out of the way, and is hit by the bullet intended for Pembleton.

Meanwhile, Terri Stivers tells Giardello about her suspicions that this entire sequence of events is somehow the result of Luther Mahoney's shooting last year by Mike Kellerman, so Giardello orders Falsone and Pembleton to question Kellerman about the shooting. Knowing that something is "wrong" about the shooting, Pembleton and Falsone assume that Mahoney was unarmed and that Lewis planted his gun, an accusation which outrages Kellerman.  Based on Kellerman's body language, Pembleton realizes Luther was armed, but that his gun was lowered when Kellerman shot him, and thus the shooting can not be justified under "imminent danger". Kellerman is ordered to turn in his badge and Glock 19 pistol, as Pembleton turns to the side and says he can no longer stand to look at Kellerman. Kellerman eventually admits to what happened. Later, he has a private discussion with Lewis while still in "the box" and asks Lewis if he can have his gun for a minute while Lewis leaves. Lewis smiles sadly and says, "I can't do that, Mikey" before leaving him alone.

Kellerman has a discussion with Giardello, who says that if Kellerman stays with the force and attempts to fight charges that he shot Luther illegally, a jury could very well acquit him under the circumstances. However, even if he is cleared, the reputations of Kellerman, Lewis, and Stivers (all of whom were on the scene) will be forever tarnished, and they will certainly be fired once their false reports of the shooting come to light. On the other hand, if Kellerman resigns on the spot, then Giardello will consider the matter closed and Lewis and Stivers will be able to keep their jobs.

Giardello and Pembleton visit Bayliss in the hospital. Pembleton, who in the past had repeatedly expressed a disdain for both friendship and God, breaks down and prays to God that his friend's life be spared. Motivated by guilt and worry over Bayliss' shooting, the strain of interrogating Kellerman, and his own moral outrage that Giardello has again chosen to forgive corrupt behavior by detectives, Pembleton resigns.

In the episode's brief coda, Kellerman drunkenly confronts an irate customer in a bar, reflexively saying he is a cop before his lack of a badge reminds him that he resigned. The man laughs at him, and Kellerman's face floods with shame and regret.

References
1. Kalat, David P. (1998). Homicide: Life on the Street: The Unofficial Companion. Los Angeles, California: Renaissance Books. .

2. Bigelow, Kathryn. (2006). Homicide Life on the Street - Season 6 (episode "Fallen Heroes"). [DVD]. A&E Home Video.

1998 American television episodes
Homicide: Life on the Street (season 6) episodes